In the White City is a 1983 Swiss drama film directed by Alain Tanner. It was entered into the 33rd Berlin International Film Festival. The film was selected as the Swiss entry for the Best Foreign Language Film at the 56th Academy Awards, but was not accepted as a nominee.

Synopsis

Paul, a mechanic on an oil tanker, settles in a small bar-hotel during a stopover in Lisbon. He sends 8 mm films and letters about his travels to his girlfriend, Élisa, who stays in Switzerland. He encounters a pretty waitress at a bar, Rosa, and they quickly become lovers. Paul continues to write to Élisa describing the whiteness of the city. He meanders through Lisbon where his purpose in life appears to become directionless and he eventually loses contact with Rosa.

Cast
 Bruno Ganz as Paul
 Teresa Madruga as Rosa
 Julia Vonderlinn as Élisa / The Swiss woman
 José Carvalho as Le patron
 Francisco Baião as Le voleur au couteau
 José Wallenstein as L'autre voleur
 Victor Costa as Le garçon du bar
 Lídia Franco as La fille du bar
 Pedro Efe as L'ami dans la taverne
 Cecília Guimarães as La dame du train
 Joana Vicente as La jeune fille du train

See also
 List of submissions to the 56th Academy Awards for Best Foreign Language Film
 List of Swiss submissions for the Academy Award for Best Foreign Language Film

References

External links

1983 films
1983 drama films
Swiss drama films
1980s French-language films
1980s German-language films
1980s Portuguese-language films
Films directed by Alain Tanner
Films produced by Paulo Branco
Films set in Lisbon
1983 multilingual films
Swiss multilingual films